Albert Joseph Kempster (23 August 1874 – 2 January 1952) was a British sport shooter who competed at the 1908 Summer Olympics and the 1912 Summer Olympics.

In 1908 he finished fifth in the running deer single shots competition as well as in the running deer double shots event. Four years later he won the bronze medal as member of the British team in the team 30 metre military pistol event as well as in the team 50 metre military pistol competition. In the individual 50 metre pistol event he finished 24th. RSM Royal Jersey Militia.

Personal life
Albert Joseph Kempster came to Jersey Channel Islands in the early 1890s. He was attached to the Northampton Regiment at the time and married a Breton, Eleanor Grosvalet in 1898 not long before being sent to South Africa where war had broken out and from where he was later invalided home with enteric fever. In 1900 he was appointed to the permanent staff of the Royal Jersey Militia.

They had twelve children: John, Cecil, Jim, Arthur, Robert, Phyllis, Doris, Charlotte, Louis, George, Joan, Yvonne.
   
He possessed an exceedingly good voice singing opera and operetta. He was an amateur boxer, gymnast and swordsman boxing for the British army in front of the Prince of Wales and the German Kaiser. He was awarded for bravery with the Albert Medal when at great risk to himself he stopped a runaway horse and carriage.

References

External links
Albert Kempster's profile at databaseOlympics

1874 births
1952 deaths
British male sport shooters
ISSF pistol shooters
Olympic shooters of Great Britain
Shooters at the 1908 Summer Olympics
Shooters at the 1912 Summer Olympics
Olympic bronze medallists for Great Britain
Olympic medalists in shooting
Medalists at the 1912 Summer Olympics